FFB may refer to:

Businesses 
 Fédération Française du Bâtiment, a French building trade group
 First Fidelity Bank, an American bank

Sporting bodies 
 Football Federation of Burundi
 Football Federation of Belarus
 Football Federation of Belize
 French Boxing Federation
 French Bridge Federation

Other organisations 
 Federal Financing Bank, a United States government corporation
 Foundation Fighting Blindness, an American nonprofit organization
 Radio forces françaises de Berlin, a defunct French military radio broadcasting service

Other uses 
 Fürstenfeldbruck (district), in Germany
 Frum from birth, a Jewish phrase; see Frum